Emiya is a surname, and may refer to one of the following fictional characters:

Shirō Emiya from Fate/stay night
Archer from Fate/stay Night
Kiritsugu Emiya from Fate/Zero